"Canadian Man" (also titled Canadian Man: Hockey) is a song written by Steven Graham Pineo and recorded by Canadian country music artist Paul Brandt. It was released in May 2001 as the lead single from his live album, Small Towns and Big Dreams. The hockey version of the song reached number-one on the Canadian Singles Chart in March 2002, being his only hit to reach number-one on the all-genre format.

Music video
The music video was directed by Joel Stewart and premiered in mid-2001.

Olympic rewrite
Brandt changed certain lyrics in the song twice, to reflect the men's gold medal wins at the 2002 Winter Olympics and at the 2010 Winter Olympics.

Chart performance

Weekly charts

Year-end charts

References

2001 singles
Paul Brandt songs
Canadian Singles Chart number-one singles
2001 songs
Songs about Canada